This is a list of episodes, with synopses and airdates, of the British sitcom The Brittas Empire. It stars Chris Barrie as Gordon Brittas, the well-meaning but incompetent manager of a leisure centre in Southern England. It first aired between 1991 and 1997 on BBC1. It was created by Richard Fegen and Andrew Norriss, who together co-wrote the first five series (1991–1996). A total of seven series and 52 episodes were created, including two Christmas specials (1994 and 1996) and two short sketches for Children In Need (in 1995 and 1996 respectively). Most of the main characters are in all episodes, but Laura is only in the first five series. Helen Brittas is in all but one episode (in series four); Linda does not appear in two episodes of the first series. Angie is only in series one, and her replacement is Julie, played by Judy Flynn, who is in all episodes from series two onwards, except for the 1996 Christmas special.

The cast appeared all in character for the Royal Variety Performance of 1996, and the success of the series has resulted in it being released on VHS and DVD by 2 Entertain, BBC Warner, and Eureka Video throughout the 1990s and 2000s. An audiobook, read by Barrie as Brittas, was also released.

Episodes

Series 1 (1991)
All episodes were filmed and produced in 1990.

Series 2 (1992)
All episodes were filmed and produced in 1991.

Series 3 (1993)
All episodes were filmed and produced in 1992.

Series 4 (1994)
All episodes were filmed and produced in 1993.

Series 5 (1994)
All episodes were filmed and produced in 1994.

Christmas special (1994)

Series 6 (1996)

Christmas special (1996)

Series 7 (1997)

 5.30 million viewers on May 3, 1994

Notes

References
General
 
  

Specific

External links
 
 BBC - The Brittas Empire - Episodes

BBC-related lists
Lists of black comedy television series episodes
Lists of British sitcom episodes